Manduca vestalis is a moth of the  family Sphingidae. It is found from Brazil to Venezuela and probably north-western Bolivia.

Adults have been recorded in November.

References

Manduca
Moths described in 1917